James Robert Hickey (October 22, 1920 – September 20, 1997), nicknamed "Sid", was a pitcher in Major League Baseball (MLB). He pitched for the Boston Braves in 1942 and 1945.

Hickey's only decision came in his MLB debut when he pitched 1 innings, surrendering 4 runs, in a 5–1 loss to the New York Giants on April 25, 1942.

References

External links

1920 births
1997 deaths
Boston Braves players
Baseball players from Massachusetts
Major League Baseball pitchers
Beckley Bengals players
Hartford Bees players
Hartford Laurels players
Hot Springs Bathers players